Brent Miller is an American television and film producer best known for the Netflix series One Day at a Time and the documentary feature (Norman Lear: Just Another Version of You). He serves as President of Production for Act III Productions.

Early life and education 
Miller was born and raised in Toledo, OH. He attended Bowling Green State University. After he graduated, Miller moved to Los Angeles.

Career
Miller began his career in the event planning industry. He was hired to plan a series of events for Norman Lear’s 85th birthday and was subsequently offered a position at Lear's multimedia holding company, Act III Productions. With Lear, Miller co-produced the Declare Yourself Unofficial Presidential Inaugural Ball in 2009.

In 2012, he co-produced a short film called The Photographs of Your Junk (Will Be Publicized!). The Huffington Post described the project as "a biting social commentary." In 2013, he created and executive produced the AXS TV documentary series Tait Stages, which followed the employees of Tait Towers and their clients, such as Kelly Clarkson and Linkin Park, and the behind-the-scenes of designing and building large scale touring stage sets. Miller was upset at what he perceived to be a lack of promotion by AXS.

In 2016, he co-produced his debut documentary feature film Norman Lear: Just Another Version of You. The film was nominated for a Primetime Emmy Award for Outstanding Documentary or Nonfiction Series Variety said the film was a "sprightly, brightly assembled celebration of the veteran showrunner," Matt Zoller Seitz called it "a striking piece of work," and the San Francisco Chronicle described it as "an entertaining look at an influential figure." That same year, Miller co-executive produced the first season of the Epix documentary series America Divided. He served as executive producer for the second season.

Miller was co-executive producer for the reboot of the 1975 CBS sitcom One Day at a Time. The reboot, focused on a Cuban American family led by a female Army veteran, began production for Netflix in 2016. The show aired for three seasons on Netflix, while season four was picked up by Pop TV in 2020.

In 2018, he executive produced the NBC pilot Guess Who Died, written by Norman Lear and Peter Tolan. In 2019, Miller executive produced the TV special, Live in Front of a Studio Audience: Norman Lear's All in the Family and The Jeffersons, earning him his second Primetime Emmy nomination and first win. He also executive produced the second installment, Live in Front of a Studio Audience: All in the Family and Good Times, which aired in December 2019.

Filmography

Film

Television

Awards and nominations 

|-
| align="center"| 2017
| American Masters
| Primetime Emmy Award for Outstanding Documentary or Nonfiction Series
| 
|-
| rowspan="3" align="center"| 2018
| rowspan="3"| One Day at a Time
| Peabody Award
| 
|-
| Television Academy Honors
| 
|-
| Television Critics Association Award for Outstanding Achievement in Comedy
| 
|-
| align="center"| 2019
|Live in Front of a Studio Audience
| Primetime Emmy Award for Outstanding Variety Special (Live)
| 
|-
| rowspan="3" align="center"| 2020
| rowspan="2"| One Day at a Time
| Imagen Awards
| 
|-
| Critics' Choice Television Awards
| 
|-
| rowspan="2"| Live in Front of a Studio Audience
| rowspan="2"| Primetime Emmy Award for Outstanding Variety Special (Live)
| 
|-
| align="center"| 2022
| 
|}

References

External links 

 Act III Productions Official Site
 Brent Miller on IMDb

Year of birth missing (living people)
Living people
American film producers
Television producers from Ohio
American documentary film producers
People from Toledo, Ohio
Primetime Emmy Award winners
Norman Lear
LGBT producers